The King's Letters (Korean: 나랏말싸미, RR: Naranmalssami; Middle Korean: 나랏말ᄊᆞ미, Yale: Nalasmalssomi;  Language of the Country) is a Korean historical drama film released on 24 July 2019. Set in the early Joseon Dynasty, it depicts Sejong the Great and Shinmi as main characters in creating Hangul. The film was directed by Jo Chul-hyun, and stars Song Kang-ho, Park Hae-il, Jeon Mi-seon, Choi Deok-moon, and Jung Hae-kyun. It grossed  worldwide.

Plot 

In the mid-15th century C.E., the king of Korea, Sejong the Great wants to create a simple writing system so the general population can obtain literacy. Up to this point, the  Joseon dynastic kingdom has been using Chinese characters.

Sejong calls upon a Buddhist monk, Shinmi, and his fellow monks to develop a new alphabet. The monks have unique insights due to their knowledge of Sanskrit and other languages that use phonetic writing systems. Sejong promises to build a Buddhist temple if the monks accomplish the task. Queen Soheon is secretly a Buddhist and welcomes the monks to the palace. Due to the tensions between Buddhists and the dominant Confucians, the servants are sworn to secrecy and the monks are disguised as court eunuchs.

The difficult project worsens Sejong's fragile health, as he suffers from diabetes. He loses sight in his right eye and is urged by his doctors to avoid stress. The king relocates to a health spa in the mountains. In the remote location, he simultaneously receives eye treatments and the monks continue to work in total secrecy. They soon complete the writing system, now known as the  Hangul or Chosŏn'gŭl.

The king returns to the palace and contends with the power struggle between Buddhists and Confucians. Both groups want credit for the writing system's creation within a published manual. The Buddhists expect Sejong to hold up his end of their deal. The Confucians are desperate to keep their power and remain on good terms with China. The king gives in to the Confucians and sends the Buddhist monks away.

In order to reunite the Sejong and Shinmi, the queen starves herself to death. Sejong is grief-stricken and decides to fulfill his wife's final wishes. Shinmi is recalled to the royal palace and there is a reconciliation. The king builds the promised Buddhist temple and Shinmi leads a funeral for the late Queen Soheon.

King Sejong notes he has been king for thirty years and will leave only one book as his legacy. Shinmi replies with an allegory that suggests Sejong's one book will have an incalculable effect upon Korean society.

Cast
Song Kang-ho as King Sejong the Great
Park Hae-il as Buddhist monk Shinmi
Jeon Mi-seon as Queen Sohun, King Sejong's wife
Choi Deok-moon as Jung In-ji
Nam Moon-chul as Choi Man-ri
Jung Hae-kyun as Go Yak-hae
Jung In-kyum as Kim-Moon
Kim Joon-hak as Moon-Jong, Sejong and Sohun's eldest son
Cha Rae-hyung as Soo-Yang, Sejong and Sohun's second son
Yoon Jung-il as Ahn-Pyung, Sejong and Sohun's third son
Tang Joon-sang as Hak-Jo
Keum Sae-rok as Lee Jin-ah
Im Sung-jae as Hak-Yul
Oh Hyun-kyung as Noh-Seung
Park Dong-hyuk as Jung Chang-son
Song Sang-eun as Pyung-Nyu

See also 

Forbidden Dream
Hunminjeongeum

References

External links 
 
 
 
 
 

2019 films
2010s historical films
2010s Korean-language films
South Korean historical drama films
Films set in the Joseon dynasty
Films about language
2010s South Korean films